was the legal case which resulted from the attempt to prevent the disclosure of the expense claims of Members of Parliament of the United Kingdom under the Freedom of Information Act 2000. The House of Commons lost the case.

See also
United Kingdom Parliamentary expenses scandal

References

External links
Corporate Officer of the House of Commons v The Information Commissioner & Ors [2008] EWHC 1084 (Admin) (16 May 2008)
Law reports

Freedom of information in the United Kingdom
High Court of Justice cases
Parliament of the United Kingdom
2008 in case law
2008 in British law
House of Commons of the United Kingdom